The Stagers is a half-hour reality television show about home staging that airs on HGTV in the U.S. and Canada.  It is produced by Paperny Films and stars Matthew Finlason, Bridget Savereux, and Maureen Powers.

Synopsis 

Official series synopsis from HGTV:

Cast 
Matthew Finlason, Stager
Bridget Savereux, Stager
Maureen Powers, Stager
Gail Taylor, Stager
Dina Holmes, Stager
Brent Melnychuk, Stager
Rukiya Bernard, Stager-in-Training
Augustin Tretinik, Assistant Stager
Sarah Steinberg, Assistant Stager
Jennifer Eves, Assistant Stager
Mitra Mansour, Assistant Stager

Awards 

Season 1 of The Stagers won four 2009 Leo Awards and was nominated for a fifth award.

The Stagers Best Show in an Information or Lifestyle Series - Won
Matthew Finlason Best Host in an Information or Lifestyle Series - Won
Keith Behrman for Best Direction in an Information or Lifestyle Series - Won
Margot Daley for Best Writing in an Information or Lifestyle Series - Won
Grant Greschuck for Best Direction in an Information or Lifestyle Series - Nominated

References

External links 
Official HGTV Canada Site for The Stagers
Official HGTV U.S. Site for The Stagers

2008 Canadian television series debuts
2000s Canadian reality television series
HGTV (Canada) original programming
Television series by Entertainment One